Sexton is a surname.

Geographical distribution
At the time of the United Kingdom Census of 1901 (the data for Ireland) and the United Kingdom Census of 1881 (the data for the rest of the United Kingdom), the frequency of the surname Sexton (Irish: Ó Seasnáin) was highest in the following counties:

 1. County Clare (1: 264)
 2. County Limerick (1: 678)
 3. County Cavan (1: 681)
 4. County Cork (1: 694)
 5. Norfolk (1: 1,199)
 6. County Kildare (1: 1,305)
 7. County Sligo (1: 1,413)
 8. County Longford (1: 1,460)
 9. Suffolk (1: 2,676)
 10. County Leitrim (1: 2,894)

As of 2014, the frequency of the surname was highest in the following countries and territories:

 1. Republic of Ireland (1: 2,082)
 2. Guernsey (1: 2,629)
 3. United States (1: 6,802)
 4. Australia (1: 9,071)
 5. New Zealand (1: 9,695)
 6. England (1: 10,290)
 7. Tuvalu (1: 11,323)
 8. Wales (1: 13,717)
 9. Marshall Islands (1: 14,022)
 10. Scotland (1: 17,208)

As of 2014, 76.8% of all known bearers of the surname Sexton were residents of the United States. The frequency of the surname was higher than national average in the following U.S. states:

 1. Kentucky (1: 1,380)
 2. Tennessee (1: 1,934)
 3. Alabama (1: 3,091)
 4. Arkansas (1: 3,409)
 5. Indiana (1: 3,607)
 6. West Virginia (1: 3,609)
 7. South Carolina (1: 3,611)
 8. Ohio (1: 3,682)
 9. Virginia (1: 4,058)
 10. Oklahoma (1: 4,519)
 11. North Carolina (1: 4,646) 
 12. Alaska (1: 5,362)
 13. Iowa (1: 5,563)
 14. Kansas (1: 5,799)
 15. Missouri (1: 6,006)
 16. Georgia (1: 6,117)
 17. Michigan (1: 6,360)

The frequency of the surname was highest (over 20 times the national average) in the following U.S. counties:

 1. Scott County, Tenn. (1: 39)
 2. Letcher County, Ky. (1: 56)
 3. Nicholas County, Ky. (1: 115)
 4. Crenshaw County, Ala. (1: 133)
 5. Wayne County, Ky. (1: 154)
 6. Morgan County, Tenn. (1: 181)
 7. Knott County, Ky. (1: 184)
 8. Hancock County, Tenn. (1: 186)
 9. Morgan County, Ky. (1: 186)
 10. Menifee County, Ky. (1: 210)
 11. Billings County, N.D. (1: 219)
 12. Union County, Tenn. (1: 239)
 13. Metcalfe County, Ky. (1: 243)
 14. Carter County, Ky. (1: 262)
 15. Wise County, Va. (1: 272)
 16. Grayson County, Va. (1: 281)
 17. Cottle County, Texas (1: 290)
 18. Bath County, Ky. (1: 299)
 19. Hart County, Ky. (1: 300)

People
Andrew Sexton (born 1979), English cricketer
Ann Sexton (born 1950), American soul singer
Anne Sexton (1928–1974), American poet
Austin O. Sexton (1852–1908), American politician
Brendan Sexton III (born 1980), American film actor
Cameron Sexton (born 1970), American politician 
Chad Sexton (born 1970), American rock drummer
Charlie Sexton (born 1968), American guitarist, singer and songwriter
Chelsea Sexton (born 1975), American advocate of alternative fuel vehicles
Collin Sexton (born 1999), American basketball player
Dan Sexton (born 1987), American ice hockey player
Dave Sexton (born 1930), English football player and manager
Edwin Sexton (? - September 16, 1983), American politician
Edward Sexton, British tailor
Frank Sexton (baseball) (1872–1938), American baseball player and coach
Franklin Barlow Sexton (1828–1900), American Confederate politician 
Helen Sexton (1862–1950), Australian surgeon
James Sexton (1856–1938), English trade unionist and politician
Jesse Sexton (1885–1948), American politician
Jimmy Sexton (born 1951), American professional baseball player
John Sexton (born 1942), American academic, president of New York University
John Sexton (photographer) (born 1953), American fine art photographer
John Henry Sexton (1863–1954), Baptist minister in South Australia
John W. Sexton (born 1958), Irish poet
Johnny Sexton (born 1985), Irish rugby player
Katy Sexton (born 1982), British Olympic swimmer
Lee Sexton (1927–2021), American Banjo Player
Leo Sexton (1908–1968), American 1932 Olympic athlete in the shot put
Lexi Sexton (born 2011), American child actor
Linda Gray Sexton (born 1953), American author and editor, daughter of Anne Sexton
Lloyd Sexton, Jr. (1912–1990), American/Hawaiian artist
Mae Sexton (born 1955), Irish politician from Longford-Roscommon
Margaret Wilkerson Sexton, American novelist
Martin Sexton (contemporary), American musician from Syracuse, New York
Mike Sexton (1947–2020), American professional poker player and commentator
P. Wayne Sexton, Sr. (contemporary), American Republican politician
Randy Sexton, current general manager of the NHL's Florida Panthers
Richard Sexton, American photographer
 Robert J. Sexton, American director
Rosi Sexton (born 1977), British Mixed Martial Arts fighter
Sam Sexton (born 1984), British heavyweight boxer
Tim Sexton (born 1949), American producer, music supervisor, and environmental entrepreneur
Tobe Sexton (born 1968), American actor, singer, dancer, producer, director
Tom Sexton (disambiguation)
Tommy Sexton (1957–1993), Canadian comedian from Newfoundland
William Sexton (politician) (1819–1895), Canadian farmer, auctioneer, and politician
Wyatt Sexton (born 1984), American college football player

References

 
Sexton is an Irish last name.